Pyramid Mall may refer to:

Pyramid Mall Plattsburgh, a shopping mall in Plattsburgh, New York built in 1975
Pyramid Mall Saratoga a shopping mall Saratoga Springs, New York
Pyramid Mall Geneva, a shopping mall in Geneva, New York
Pyramid Mall Johnstown, a shopping mall in Johnstown, New York built in 1975
Pyramid Mall Fulton, a shopping mall in Fulton, Oswego County, New York built in 1972 
Pyramid Mall Oneonta, a shopping mall in Oneonta, New York built in 1972